{{DISPLAYTITLE:Malate dehydrogenase (NAD(P)+)}}

Malate dehydrogenase (NAD(P)+) (MdH II, NAD(P)+-dependent malate dehyrogenase) is an enzyme with systematic name (S)-malate:NAD(P)+ oxidoreductase. This enzyme catalyses the following chemical reaction

 (S)-malate + NAD(P)+  oxaloacetate + NAD(P)H + H+

This enzyme, which was characterized from the methanogenic archaeon Methanobacterium thermoautotrophicum, catalyses only the reduction of oxaloacetate, and can use NAD+ and NADP+ with similar specific activity. It is different from EC 1.1.1.37 (malate dehydrogenase (NAD+)), EC 1.1.1.82 (malate dehydrogenase (NADP+)) and EC 1.1.5.4 (malate dehydrogenase (quinone)).

References

External links 
 

EC 1.1.1